Piecemeal necrosis generally refers to a necrosis that occurs in fragments.

Piecemeal necrosis in liver aka interface hepatitis is necrosis of the limiting plates, by inflammatory cells. It may be identified as actual necrosis of cells or by irregularity of the limiting plates which is caused IOS's hepatocytes and replacement with inflammatory cells and/or fibrosis.


Liver
When used in relation to the [nibbling necrosis and interface necrosis) refers specifically to a loss and degeneration of (limiting plate) hepatocytes at the lobular-portal-interface, producing a moth-eaten irregular appearance. Piecemeal necrosis of the liver is associated with a lymphocytic infiltrate into the adjacent parenchyma, and with destruction of individual hepatocytes along the edges of the portal tract.It is a cardinal feature of chronic viral hepatitis (especially chronic hepatitis) as well as chronic autoimmune hepatitis. > Defined as destruction of hepatocytes at the limiting plate.

References

Hepatology
Necrosis